The FIBA Under-17 Basketball World Cup All-Tournament Team is a bi-annual award, that is given by FIBA, to the five best players of the FIBA Under-17 World Cup.

Honourees

References

All-Tournament Team
Basketball trophies and awards